Division No. 20, Unorganized, North Part is an unorganized area in northwestern Manitoba. It has a population of 120 as of 2011, and an area of 1,760.53 km2.

References

Unorganized areas in Manitoba
Populated places in Parkland Region, Manitoba